Wilbert King (February 16, 1915 - 1965) was an American professional basketball and baseball player. King played in the Negro leagues from 1944 to 1947 with the New York Black Yankees, Cleveland Buckeyes, Chicago American Giants, and Homestead Grays.  He played in the National Basketball League for the Detroit Gems in the 1946–47 season and averaged 8.2 points per game.

References

External links
 and Seamheads

1915 births
1965 deaths
American men's basketball players
Basketball players from Detroit
Detroit Gems players
Guards (basketball)
Harlem Globetrotters players
Pershing High School alumni
Chicago American Giants players
Cleveland Buckeyes players
Homestead Grays players
New York Black Yankees players
Baseball second basemen
Baseball players from Alabama
20th-century African-American sportspeople